The Carters (stylized in all caps) are an American musical duo composed of married artists Beyoncé and Jay-Z. They released their first album as the Carters, Everything Is Love, on June 16, 2018. The album was certified gold by the Recording Industry Association of America (RIAA).

Before formally naming their collaboration, the duo performed together on two world tours, On the Run Tour (2014) and OTR II (2018), and released a number of collaborations, beginning with the 2002 single "'03 Bonnie & Clyde" from Jay-Z's The Blueprint 2: The Gift & The Curse. The couple had their first number one single the next year with "Crazy in Love" from Beyoncé's debut solo album Dangerously in Love.

History

Early collaborations
After co-writing Amil's song "I Got That" in 2000, the couple later went on to make their first recording collaboration with "'03 Bonnie & Clyde", which peaked at number 4 on the Billboard Hot 100. The duo co-wrote five tracks of Beyoncé's debut album, Dangerously in Love, including its lead single "Crazy in Love", which topped the charts in the US. This was followed by two collaborations on her follow-up, B-Day, which spawned their single "Déjà Vu", which peaked at number 4 in the US and number one in the UK.

Following several of Beyoncé's appearances on Jay-Z's records Kingdom Come and Watch the Throne, the duo released the number two US hit, "Drunk in Love". Beyoncé then appeared on two songs on Jay-Z's Magna Carta Holy Grail (2014). That same year, the couple then launched their first collaborative tour with On the Run Tour (2014), named after one of the collaborations from the record. The two later released two collaborations with DJ Khaled and worked on The Lion King: The Gift, which Beyoncé had curated.

Formation and Everything is Love
In 2014 and 2018, The Carters embarked on two world tours with On the Run Tour and On the Run Tour II. On June 16, 2018, during a concert in London as part of their On the Run II Tour, the Carters premiered the music video for "Apeshit". Following the conclusion of the video, the words "ALBUM OUT NOW" appeared on the screen. Everything Is Love was released exclusively on Tidal for streaming and digital download, before being made available across all other platforms. The record received positive reviews and debuted at number two on the Billboard 200. The album was later ranked as one of the best albums of the year by critics and won a Grammy Award for Urban Contemporary Album.

In 2020, Jay-Z co-wrote "Savage (Remix)" by Beyoncé, and Megan Thee Stallion and Beyoncé's solo single, "Black Parade". The former had reached the top of the charts in the United States, with all proceeds benefit Bread of Life Houston's COVID-19 relief efforts, which includes providing over 14 tons of food and supplies to 500 families and 100 senior citizens in Houston weekly.

Discography

Studio albums

Singles

Promotional single

Other charted songs

Recording collaborations

Writing collaborations

Notes

Awards and nominations

Tours
On the Run Tour (2014)
On the Run II Tour (2018)

Festival performances
Global Citizen Festival: Mandela 100 at FNB Stadium in Johannesburg, South Africa (2 December 2018)

References

 

2018 establishments in the United States
Musical groups established in 2018
African-American musical groups
American musical duos
Beyoncé
Columbia Records artists
Jay-Z
Roc Nation artists
Male–female musical duos
Married couples
Parkwood Entertainment artists
Grammy Award winners
Contemporary R&B supergroups